Eric, Erik, or Éric Martin may refer to:

Arts and entertainment
 Erik Martin (1936–2017), German songwriter
 Eric Martin (musician) (born 1960), American singer-songwriter and member of Mr. Big
 Me One (pseudonym of Eric Martin, born 1970), Jamaican-Welsh rapper and label owner
 Eric Martin (writer), American television writer

Sports

Association football (soccer)
 Eric Martin (footballer, born 1946), Scottish footballer
 Éric Martin (footballer, born 1959), French footballer
 Éric Martin (footballer, born 1973), French footballer

Cricket
 Eric Martin (Middlesex cricketer) (1894–1924), English cricketer
 Eric Martin (Essex cricketer) (1907–1978), English cricketer
 Eric Martin (Nottinghamshire cricketer) (1925–2015), English cricketer

Other sports
 Eric Martin (wide receiver) (born 1961), American football wide receiver
 Eric Martin (racing driver) (1969–2002), American racing driver who was killed at the Lowes Motor Speedway
 Erik Martin (basketball) (born 1971), American basketball player and coach
 Eric Martin (lacrosse) (born 1981), American lacrosse player
 Eric Martin (linebacker) (born 1991), American football linebacker

Others
 Eric Charles Fitzgerald Martin (1905–1973), Canadian politician in British Columbia